Gloria is the first album by the Shadows of Knight, released in 1966 on Dunwich Records 666.  The Shadows of Knight are primarily known for their hit version of the Van Morrison penned Them band's  "Gloria", but the band today is regarded as one of the original punk bands.

The band's association with "Gloria" has caused some to miscategorize them as one-hit wonders.  One reviewer points out that their first album, and its follow-up, Back Door Men, represent far greater diversity:  "(The Gloria album) positively rocks with a raw energy of a band straight out of the teen clubs, playing with a total abandon and an energy level that seems to explode out of the speakers. Equal parts Rolling Stones, Yardbirds, Who, and snotty little Chicago-suburb bad boys, the Shadows of Knight could easily put the torch to Chess blues classics, which make up the majority of the songs included here. Their wild takes on "I Just Want to Make Love to You," "Oh Yeah," and "Got My Mojo Working" rank right up there with any British Invasion band's version from the same time period."

Background
The band released the Gloria album in the summer of 1966, after releasing "Gloria" as a single backed by "Darkside" in December 1965. The single charted at #10 according to Billboard.  Later in the year, "Oh Yeah" was released from the same album as a single backed by "Light Bulb Blues", and charted as high as #39. The album liner notes credit the album as "Produced for Dunwich Records" instead of crediting a specific producer.

Track listing 

 "Gloria" (Van Morrison) – 2:34
 "Light Bulb Blues" (Jerry McGeorge, James Alan Sohns, Joseph J. Kelly) – 2:32
 "I Got My Mojo Working" (McKinley Morganfield) – 3:28
 "Darkside" (Warren Rogers, James Alan Sohns) – 2:00
 "Boom Boom" (John Lee Hooker) – 2:28
 "Let It Rock" (Chuck Berry) – 1:52
 "Oh Yeah" (Ellas McDaniel) – 2:45
 "It Always Happens That Way" (Warren Rogers, James Alan Sohns) – 1:52
 "You Can't Judge a Book by Looking at the Cover" (Willie Dixon) – 2:37
 "(I'm Your) Hoochie Coochie Man" (Willie Dixon) – 3:52
 "I Just Want to Make Love to You" (Willie Dixon) – 3:49

Bonus tracks on LP and CD reissue, 1998 

  "Oh Yeah" (alternate version); (McDaniel) – 2:45
 "I Got My Mojo Working" (alternate version); (Morganfield) – 3:14
 "Someone Like Me" (single release not on original album); (David MacDowell, Rich Novak) – 2:18

Personnel 
Shadows of Knight
 James Alan Sohns – vocals
 Warren Rogers – lead guitar, backing vocals
 Jerry McGeorge – rhythm guitar, backing vocals
 Joseph J. Kelly – bass guitar
 Tom Schiffour – drums
Technical
 Bob Kidder – engineer
 Jerry DeClercq – mastering
 Ron Fratell – art direction
 Don Bronstein - cover photograph

Chart performance

Album

Singles

References 

1966 debut albums
Radar Records albums
The Shadows of Knight albums
Sundazed Records albums
Dunwich Records albums